Jacob Mendy (born 27 December 1996) is a Gambian footballer who plays as a defender or winger for Wrexham.

Career

Club career

As a youth player, Mendy joined the youth academy of Spanish La Liga side Atlético Madrid. In 2017, he signed for English ninth tier side Redhill. In 2018, he signed for Carshalton Athletic in the English seventh tier. In 2019, Mendy signed for English sixth tier club Wealdstone, helping them earn promotion to the English fifth tier. In 2021, he signed for Boreham Wood in the English fifth tier. In 2022, he signed for Welsh team Wrexham.

International career

Mendy is eligible to represent Gambia internationally, having been born there.

References

External links

 

Living people
1996 births
Gambian footballers
Spanish footballers
Gambian emigrants to Spain
Atlético Madrid footballers
Carshalton Athletic F.C. players
Wealdstone F.C. players
Boreham Wood F.C. players
Wrexham A.F.C. players